Friedell is a surname. Notable people with the surname include:
Egon Friedell (1878–1938), Austrian cultural historian, playwright, actor and Kabarett performer, journalist and theatre critic
Harold Friedell (1905–1958), American organist
Wilhelm L. Friedell (1883–1958), American rear admiral

See also
Friedel, another surname